Henry Reed Welsford (June 14, 1900 – April 1974) was an American rower who competed in the 1924 Summer Olympics. In 1924 he won the bronze medal as member of the American boat in the coxed four event.

References

External links
 profile

1900 births
1974 deaths
American male rowers
Rowers at the 1924 Summer Olympics
Olympic bronze medalists for the United States in rowing
Medalists at the 1924 Summer Olympics